Larryleachia cactiformis is a stapeliad succulent, native to Namaqualand in South Africa, where it grows in rocky areas. Larryleachia cactiformis proves as difficult a member of the family Apocynaceae in cultivation as others in its genus.

Description
True its name, Larryleachia cactiformis grows in the shape of a small cactus, with no leaves, spines or branches but ribbed with mammaillae on 4-6 sided protrusions. It is greyish green in colour and starts spherical, then grows into a short cylindrical stem of 4-6 inches high, and sometimes taller in captivity. The flowers grow from 0.2-0.6 inch peduncles from the top, and are 1 inch in diameter when open. The corolla is pale yellow, fleshy, five pointed, shrivelled on the inside and decorated with dark red spots and lighter red tips. Seeds are flat and brown.

Cultivation
The usual problems for cultivation of Larryleachia apply to L. cactiformis, primary of these being the need for year- round warmth and sunlight, and the dangers of root rot and mealy bugs. Grafting L. cactiformis onto a rootstock tuber of a Ceropegia, such as Ceropegia woodii, and treating the plants against root mealy bugs should mostly alleviate these issues, though propagation is still a problem as the plant does not offset or seed readily and grows difficultly and slowly from seedling.

References
The Complete Encyclopedia of Succulents by Zdenek Jezek and Libor Kunte (as Trichocaulon cactiforme)

cactiformis
Endemic flora of South Africa